Three Easy Pieces is a 2007 album by American alternative rock band Buffalo Tom. The album - nine years removed from their last LP Smitten - took over two years of off-and-on recording sessions to complete.

Track listing 
 "Bad Phone Call"
 "Three Easy Pieces"
 "You'll Never Catch Him"
 "Bottom of the Rain"
 "Lost Downtown"
 "Renovating"
 "Good Girl"
 "Pendleton"
 "Gravity"
 "Hearts of Palm"
 "September Shirt"
 "CC and Callas"
 "Thrown"

All songs by Buffalo Tom.

Personnel 
Buffalo Tom
Bill Janovitz - vocals, guitar, piano, organ, percussion, trumpet
Chris Colbourn - vocals, bass, guitar
Tom Maginnis - drums, percussion
with:
Chris Toppin - backing vocals
Hilken Mancini - backing vocals
Clint Conley - backing vocals
Tim Obetz - pedal steel guitar

Recording Details
Recorded at Q Division Studios
Engineered by Matt Beaudoin and Matt Tahaney
Mixed by Tom Polce
Mastered by Andy VanDette

References

Buffalo Tom albums
2007 albums
New West Records albums